Cecil Henry Ethelwood Miller is Guyanese-Kenyan former Chief Justice of Kenya. He served between 1986–1989 and was succeeded by Allan Robin Winston Hancox.

The Miller Inquiry

In 1982 he chaired a Judicial Commission appointed to inquire into allegations involving former Attorney General of Kenya Charles Mugane Njonjo after appointment by President Daniel arap Moi.

See also
 Chief Justice of Kenya
 Court of Appeal of Kenya
 High Court of Kenya

References

Year of birth missing (living people)
Living people
20th-century Kenyan lawyers
Chief justices of Kenya